The canton of Rozoy-sur-Serre is a former administrative division in northern France. It was disbanded following the French canton reorganisation which came into effect in March 2015. It consisted of 30 communes, which joined the canton of Vervins in 2015. It had 7,380 inhabitants (2012).

The canton comprised the following communes:

Archon
Les Autels
Berlise
Brunehamel
Chaourse
Chéry-lès-Rozoy
Clermont-les-Fermes
Cuiry-lès-Iviers
Dagny-Lambercy
Dizy-le-Gros
Dohis
Dolignon
Grandrieux
Lislet
Montcornet
Montloué
Morgny-en-Thiérache
Noircourt
Parfondeval
Raillimont
Renneval
Résigny
Rouvroy-sur-Serre
Rozoy-sur-Serre
Sainte-Geneviève
Soize
Le Thuel
Vigneux-Hocquet
La Ville-aux-Bois-lès-Dizy
Vincy-Reuil-et-Magny

Demographics

See also
Cantons of the Aisne department

References

Former cantons of Aisne
2015 disestablishments in France
States and territories disestablished in 2015